Na Gyung-che is the co-representative of the Justice Party in South Korea. He was a delegate of the Labor Party in South Korea.

External links 
  

1973 births
Living people
People from Gwangju
Democratic Labor Party (South Korea) politicians
New Progressive Party (South Korea) politicians
Leaders of the Labor Party (South Korea)